Permethrin is a medication and an insecticide. As a medication, it is used to treat scabies and lice. It is applied to the skin as a cream or lotion. As an insecticide, it can be sprayed onto clothing or mosquito nets to kill the insects that touch them.

Side effects include rash and irritation at the area of use. Use during pregnancy appears to be safe. It is approved for use on and around people over the age of two months. Permethrin is in the pyrethroid family of medications. It works by disrupting the function of the neurons of lice and scabies mites.

Permethrin was discovered in 1973. It is on the World Health Organization's List of Essential Medicines. In 2020, it was the 427th most commonly prescribed medication in the United States, with more than 100thousand prescriptions.

Uses

Insecticide 
 In agriculture, to protect crops (a drawback is that it is lethal to bees)
 In agriculture, to kill livestock parasites
 For industrial and domestic insect control
 In the textile industry, to prevent insect attack of woollen products
 In aviation, the WHO, IHR and ICAO require arriving aircraft be disinsected prior to embarkation, departure, descent, or deplaning in certain countries. Aircraft disinsection with permethrin-based products is recommended only prior to embarkation. Prior to departure (after boarding), at the top of descent or on arrival, d-phenothrin-based (1R-trans phenothrin) aircraft insecticides are recommended.

Insect repellent 
 As a personal protective measure, permethrin is applied to clothing. It is a cloth impregnant, notably in mosquito nets and field wear. While permethrin may be marketed as an insect repellent, it does not prevent insects from landing. Instead it works by incapacitating or killing insects before they can bite.
 In pet flea preventive collars or treatment (safe for use on dogs but not cats)
 In timber treatment

Medical use 
Permethrin is available for topical use as a cream or lotion. It is indicated for the treatment and prevention in exposed individuals of head lice and treatment of scabies. It has an excellent safety profile; its main drawback is its cost.

For treatment of scabies: Adults and children older than 2 months are instructed to apply the cream to the entire body from head to the soles of the feet. Wash off the cream after 8–14 hours. In general, one treatment is curative. A single application of permethrin is more effective than a single oral dose of ivermectin for scabies.  In addition permethrin provides more rapid symptomatic relief than ivermectin. When a second dose of ivermectin is days later, the efficacy between permethrin and ivermectin approach parity.

For treatment of head lice: Apply to hair, scalp, and neck after shampooing. Leave in for 10 minutes and rinse. Avoid contact with eyes.

Pest control / effectiveness and persistence 
In agriculture, permethrin is mainly used on cotton, wheat, maize, and alfalfa crops. Its use is controversial because, as a broad-spectrum chemical, it kills indiscriminately; as well as the intended pests, it can harm beneficial insects, including honey bees, as well as cats and aquatic life.

Permethrin kills ticks and mosquitoes on contact with treated clothing. A method of reducing deer tick populations by treating rodent vectors involves stuffing biodegradable cardboard tubes with permethrin-treated cotton. Mice collect the cotton for lining their nests. Permethrin on the cotton kills any immature ticks feeding on the mice.

Permethrin is used in tropical areas to prevent mosquito-borne disease such as dengue fever and malaria. Mosquito nets used to cover beds may be treated with a solution of permethrin. This increases the effectiveness of the bed net by killing parasitic insects before they are able to find gaps or holes in the net. Personnel working in malaria-endemic areas may be instructed to treat their clothing with permethrin as well.

Permethrin is the most commonly used insecticide worldwide for the protection of wool from keratinophagous insects such as Tineola bisselliella.

To better protect soldiers from the risk and annoyance of biting insects, the British and US armies are treating all new uniforms with permethrin.

Permethrin (as well as other long-term pyrethroids) is effective over several months, in particular when used indoors. International studies report that permethrin can be detected in house dust, in fine dust, and on indoor surfaces even years after the application. Its degradation rate under indoor conditions is approximately 10% after 3 months.

Resistance 
Contrary to the most common mechanism of insecticide resistance evolution  selection for preexisting, low-frequency alleles  in Aedes aegypti permethrin resistance has arisen through the mechanism common to pyrethroids and DDT known as "knockdown resistance" (kdr) mutations. García et al 2009 found that a kdr allele has rapidly spread throughout Mexico and recently become dominant there.

Side effects 
Permethrin application can cause mild skin irritation and burning. Permethrin has little systemic absorption, and is considered safe for topical use in adults and children over the age of two months. The FDA has assigned it as pregnancy category B. Animal studies have shown no effects on fertility or teratogenicity, but studies in humans have not been performed. The excretion of permethrin in breastmilk is unknown, and it is recommended that breastfeeding be temporarily discontinued during treatment. Skin reactions are uncommon.
Excessive exposure to permethrin can cause nausea, headache, muscle weakness, excessive salivation, shortness of breath, and seizures. Worker exposure to the chemical can be monitored by measurement of the urinary metabolites, while severe overdose may be confirmed by measurement of permethrin in serum or blood plasma.

Permethrin does not present any notable genotoxicity or immunotoxicity in humans and farm animals, but is classified by the EPA as a likely human carcinogen when ingested, based on reproducible studies in which mice fed permethrin developed liver and lung tumors.

Pharmacokinetics 

Permethrin is a chemical categorized in the pyrethroid insecticide group. The chemicals in the pyrethroid family are created to emulate the chemicals found in the chrysanthemum flower.

Absorption 
Absorption of topical permethrin is minimal. One in vivo study demonstrated 0.5% absorption in the first 48 hours based upon excretion of urinary metabolites.

Distribution 
Distribution of permethrin has been studied in rat models, with highest amounts accumulating in fat and the brain. This can be explained by the lipophilic nature of the permethrin molecule.

Metabolism 
Metabolism of permethrin occurs mainly in the liver, where the molecule undergoes oxidation by the cytochrome P450 system, as well as hydrolysis, into metabolites.
Elimination of these metabolites occurs via urinary excretion.

Stereochemistry 
Permethrin has four stereoisomers (two enantiomeric pairs), arising from the two stereocenters in the cyclopropane ring. The trans enantiomeric pair is known as transpermethrin. (1R,3S)-trans and (1R,3R)-cis enantiomers are responsible for the insecticidal properties of permethrin.

History 
Permethrin was first made in 1973.

Numerous synthetic routes exist for the production of the DV-acid ester precursor. The pathway known as the Kuraray Process uses four steps. In general, the final step in the total synthesis of any of the synthetic pyrethroids is a coupling of a DV-acid ester and an alcohol. In the case of permethrin synthesis, the DV-acid cyclopropanecarboxylic acid, 3-(2,2-dichloroethenyl)-2,2-dimethyl-, ethyl ester, is coupled with the alcohol, m-phenoxybenzyl alcohol, through a transesterification reaction with base. Tetraisopropyl titanate or sodium ethylate may be used as the base.

The alcohol precursor may be prepared in three steps. First, m-cresol, chlorobenzene, sodium hydroxide, potassium hydroxide, and cuprous chloride react to yield m-phenoxytoluene. Second, oxidation of m-phenoxytoluene over selenium dioxide provides m-phenoxybenzaldehyde. Third, a Cannizzaro reaction of the benzaldehyde in formaldehyde and potassium hydroxide affords the m-phenoxybenzyl alcohol.

Brand names 
In Nordic countries and North America, a permethrin formulation for lice treatment is marketed under trade name Nix, available over the counter. Johnson & Johnson's UK brand Lyclear covers an assortment of different products, mostly non-insecticidal, but a few of which are based on permethrin.

Stronger concentrations of permethrin are used to treat scabies (which embed inside the skin), compared to lice (which remain outside the skin). In the U.S. the more concentrated products such as Elimite are available by prescription only.

Other animals
It is known to be highly toxic to cats, fish and aquatic species with long-lasting effects.

Cats 
Permethrin is toxic to cats; however, it has little effect on dogs. Pesticide-grade permethrin is toxic to cats. Many cats die after being given flea treatments intended for dogs, or by contact with dogs having recently been treated with permethrin. In cats it may induce hyperexcitability, tremors, seizures, and death.

Toxic exposure of permethrin can cause several symptoms, including convulsion, hyperaesthesia, hyperthermia, hypersalivation, and loss of balance and coordination. Exposure to pyrethroid-derived drugs such as permethrin requires treatment by a veterinarian, otherwise the poisoning is often fatal. This intolerance is due to a defect in glucuronosyltransferase, a common detoxification enzyme in other mammals, that also makes the cat intolerant to paracetamol (acetaminophen). The use of any external parasiticides based on permethrin is contraindicated for cats.

Aquatic organisms 
Permethrin is listed as a "restricted use" substance by the US Environmental Protection Agency (EPA) due to its high toxicity to aquatic organisms, so permethrin and permethrin-contaminated water should be properly disposed of. Permethrin is quite stable, having a half life of 51–71 days in an aqueous environment exposed to light. It is also highly persistent in soil.

See also 
 Benzyl benzoate
 DEET
 Methoprene
 Pyrethrin
 Pyrethrum

References

External links 
 
 Permethrin General Fact Sheet – National Pesticide Information Center
 Permethrin Technical Fact Sheet – National Pesticide Information Center
 Permethrin-treated Clothing Hot Topic – National Pesticide Information Center
 "Health Effects of Permethrin-Impregnated Army Battle-Dress Uniforms", National Research Council (1994, US)
 Permethrin Pesticide Information Profile – Extension Toxicology Network
 

Insect repellents
Antiparasitic agents
Household chemicals
Organochlorides
Endocrine disruptors
(3-phenoxyphenyl)methyl 2,2,3-trimethylcyclopropane-1-carboxylates
Acaricides
World Health Organization essential medicines
Wikipedia medicine articles ready to translate